Neohesperidin is a flavanone glycoside found in citrus fruits. It is the 7-O-neohesperidose derivative of hesperetin, which in turn is the 4'-methoxy derivative of eriodictyol. Neohesperidin dihydrochalcone has an intense sweet taste, and is listed as a Generally Recognized as Safe flavour enhancer by the Flavour and Extract Manufacturers' Association.

References

External links

Flavanone glycosides
Flavonoids found in Rutaceae